Giles Ingram Matthey (born 11 November 1987) is a British actor best known for his role as Claude Crane on the HBO original series True Blood, Gideon on the ABC series Once Upon a Time, and Jordan Reed on FOX series 24: Live Another Day.

Early life and education
Giles Matthey was born in Australia to a British father and an Australian mother.  He moved to London with his family at the age of 2. His father (John) passed away when he was a child and his mother (Kerrin) is a successful Interior Designer. He has an older sister Arabella, who is a Security Consultant in Melbourne, Australia. He became interested in acting during his teenage years whist studying at Harrow School and eventually moved to New York City. In the US, he completed a two-year conservatory program at the Lee Strasberg Theatre and Film Institute.

Career
Matthey's first acting job was an appearance in The Good Wife in 2011. In 2012, he was cast as Claude Crane in the HBO series True Blood. Matthey appeared in nine episodes from 2012 to 2013. He also had a supporting role as Apple design chief Jonathan Ive in Jobs, and a lead role on the 2014 independent film Boulevard with Robin Williams. In 2014, he was cast as CIA intelligence analyst Jordan Reed in FOX limited event television series 24: Live Another Day.

He also appeared in the CBS drama series NCIS playing Daniel Budd, a young man who is the leader of the terrorist group, the Calling. Matthey's role on NCIS ended when his character died in the NCIS Season 13 premiere episode as Budd was shot dead by NCIS Special Agent Anthony DiNozzo, played by Michael Weatherly. He landed a recurring role in the sixth season of the fantasy-drama series Once Upon a Time, portraying the grown-up version of Belle and Rumplestiltskin's newborn son Gideon.

Filmography

Film

Television

References

External links

Australian emigrants to England
1987 births
Living people
Lee Strasberg Theatre and Film Institute alumni
English male television actors
21st-century English male actors
English male film actors
Australian male television actors
21st-century Australian male actors
Australian male film actors
Male actors from London
Australian people of British descent